Trivigno is a surname. Notable people with the surname include:

Bobby Trivigno (born 1999), American ice hockey player
Dana Trivigno (born 1994), American ice hockey player 
Pat Trivigno (1922–2013), American artist and professor

Italian-language surnames